A bucket brigade or human chain is a method for transporting items where items are passed from one (relatively stationary) person to the next.

The method was important in firefighting before the advent of hand-pumped fire engines, whereby firefighters would pass buckets to each other to extinguish a blaze. A famous example of this is the Union Fire Company. This technique is still common where using machines to move water, supplies, or other items would be impractical.

This method needs a number of participants sufficient for covering the distance.

As a metaphor 

This principle inspired various technical items, e.g. the bucket-brigade device.

The term "bucket brigade" is also used for a certain method of organizing manual order picking in distribution centers. Here customer orders to be processed are passed from one order picker to the next. When the last picker in line has finished picking an order they walk back and take over the work of the next-to-last picker, who in their turn also walk back and so on, until the first person in line is reached, who then commences picking an entirely new order.

Similar applications of the idea of bucket brigades also exist for production lines.

See also
Electron transport chain
Chain gang
Pipelining

References

External links

One-minute video about Colonial American firefighting with bucket brigades

Firefighting
Logistics
Metaphors referring to objects